Costa de Prata ("Silver Coast") is a region in Central Western Portugal that consists of beaches and fishing towns stretching from Barrinha de Esmoriz to Santa Cruz, with a length of approximately .
It is bordered by the Costa Verde in the north and the Costa de Lisboa to the south.

Climate
It has a Warm-summer Mediterranean climate, similar to that of Coastal California.

References

Regions of Portugal